Justice Bao is a Mainland Chinese television series, starring Jin Chao-chun, Kenny Ho and Fan Hung-hsuan. The three actors first portrayed their respective characters in the 1993 Taiwanese hit Justice Bao. Lung Lung from the 1993 series also reprised his role.

Units

Cast
 Note: Some cast members played multiple roles.

International broadcast

References

 Legend of Bao back on TV 16 years later http://www.china.org.cn/culture/2009-07/23/content_18188089.htm

Fictional depictions of Bao Zheng in television
2008 Chinese television series debuts
2000s crime drama television series
Mandarin-language television shows
Television shows set in Kaifeng
Gong'an television series